Duns Football Club is a football club from Duns in Scotland, playing in the A League of the Border Amateur League. The club previously competed in the East of Scotland Football League before withdrawing prior to the 2016–17 season.

There used to be a team called Duns F.C. that competed at the senior non-league level in Scotland, and for many years this team played in the East of Scotland League. The current Duns club (often termed as Duns AFC or Duns Ams) regards itself as the successor of the original Duns senior side, and lists in its honours seven Border Cup successes, which spans the period of the different clubs.

They played in the Scottish Cup proper on 21 occasions, including a match at Parkhead against Celtic. In the 1956–57 cup Duns recorded an 11–1 first round victory over Edinburgh University, before losing to Eyemouth United in the next round. Duns played continuously in the East of Scotland League from the league's expansion in 1928–29 until the end of the 1967–68 season. Following this they had a couple of short spells in the league before their final appearance in the 1975–76 season.

The current incarnation of the team won the A League of the Border AFL on six occasions, including four championships won when the side was known as Duns Legion.

Honours
SFA South Region Challenge Cup
Runners-up: 2011–12
King Cup

 Winners: 1935–36, 1938–39, 1957–58, 1963–64

Multiple Border amateur league honours

References

Berwickshire
Football clubs in Scotland
East of Scotland Football League teams
Football clubs in the Scottish Borders
Duns, Scottish Borders